Reverend James Barr (26 July 1862 – 1949) was a Scottish minister and a British Liberal then Labour politician and a noted pacifist and socialist. He was also a strong supporter of home rule for Scotland, a minimum wage and the Temperance movement.

Life
He was born on 26 July 1862 at Beanscroft Farm near Fenwick, East Ayrshire the son of Allan Barr a farmer and his wife Elizabeth Brown.

He studied a general degree at Glasgow University graduating MA in 1884. He returned to university around 1889 to study Divinity, graduating BD in 1892.

He was ordained as a minister of the Free Church of Scotland in 1889 serving Johnstone and Wamphray. In 1895 he became minister of Dennistoun in east Glasgow.

Barr was originally a Liberal but then joined the Independent Labour Party. He served as the Member of Parliament for Motherwell, from 1924 to 1931 and then for Coatbridge from 1935 to 1945. He was also the President of The Scottish Home Rule Association.

He served as Chairman of the Select committee on capital punishment, 1929–1930, which reported at the end of the latter year.

In 1930–1931, Barr was Chairman of the Liaison Committee, as the Chairman of the Parliamentary Labour Party was then known at any time when the party was in government.

A Presbyterian minister, Barr strongly opposed any link between church and state; in his view, the Church must support and maintain itself on an entirely voluntary basis. For this reason, he was a prominent member of the United Free Church of Scotland and he led the opposition to that group's reunion with the Church of Scotland in 1929; he and those of like mind did not participate in the reunion and continued as the United Free Church of Scotland, which is still in existence. In 1929, the year that the remainder of the United Free Church merged with the Church of Scotland, he was the first Moderator of the General Assembly of the United Free Church of Scotland Continuing, the section which refused to merge with the Church of Scotland.

His maiden speech as an MP was an attack on the Church of Scotland (Property and Endowments) Act 1925 and lasted just under an hour and a half.

Private life
In 1890 he married Martha Wilson Stephen. They had five children including their last child who was the minister Elizabeth Barr.  She was first woman in Scotland to be a Presbyterian minister.

Barr was the grandfather of James Barr (biblical scholar).

Published works

References

 Sandra Osborne MP Speech on the Second Reading of the House of Commons (Removal of Clergy Disqualification) Bill, (6 February 2001) Hansard vol 362 cols 837-38

External links 
 

1862 births
1949 deaths
Members of the Parliament of the United Kingdom for Scottish constituencies
UK MPs 1924–1929
UK MPs 1929–1931
UK MPs 1935–1945
Scottish temperance activists
Scottish pacifists
Calvinist pacifists
Scottish Labour MPs
Scottish Christian socialists
Presbyterian socialists
19th-century Ministers of the Free Church of Scotland
Ministers of the United Free Church of Scotland
Parliamentary Peace Aims Group